The Holm of Huip is a small island in the Orkney Islands, in Spurness Sound to the north west of Stronsay.

The Holm has a cairn on it, and a number of grey seals.

Geography and geology
Like most of Orkney, the Holm is formed from Old Red Sandstone.

It lies opposite the airstrip and Huipness on Stronsay, and separated from it by Huip Sound.

References

Uninhabited islands of Orkney